Jason Alexander Cruz (born February 6, 1974) is the American lead singer and lyricist of punk band, Strung Out, which formed in 1989 when he was 15 years old. He is also an artist, and a poet and fronts his roots Americana band 'Jason Cruz and Howl'. His personal website showcases his various forms of original artwork (paintings as well as graphic design and photography).

Early life
Cruz grew up in and around Los Angeles. He focused his energies on art and creative writing in school and began playing with Strung Out in 1991 in Southern California.

Jason's major influences include classic artists such as Tom Waits, Jimi Hendrix, Hank Williams Sr, William Burroughs, Charles Bukowski, and Bob Dylan and visual artists Robert Mcginnis and Jean-Michel Basquiat. He has said that he was influenced by the desert, dirt road swap meets and the melancholy music that his mother used to listen to when he was growing up. The first concert he ever went to was Depeche Mode in 1986 when he was 12 years old then graduated to punk rock shows and skateboarding.

Jason apprenticed as a tattoo artist for two years then took up oil Painting under the moniker 'Amerikan Blackheart' and has been showing regularly in L.A. and southern California for the past four years as well as performing with his band Howl.
In addition to being a songwriter, musician, and artist, he has also published 3 original poems, which can be found in the collection entitled Revolution On Canvas: Poetry From The Indie Music Scene.

Cruz provided lead vocals and wrote the lyrics for T4 Project, a band made up of many well-known punk musicians, for its 2008 "Story-Based Concept Album."

On August 21, 2012, Cruz self-released his first solo record titled Loungecore under the name, Jason Cruz and Howl.

Jason currently lives in Ventura, California. In July 2010 Jason welcomed daughter Sydney Echo Cruz.

Discography

Strung Out
See Strung Out for full list
Another Day in Paradise (1994)
Suburban Teenage Wasteland Blues (1996)
Twisted by Design (1998)
The Element of Sonic Defiance (2000)
An American Paradox (2002)
Exile In Oblivion (2004)
Blackhawks Over Los Angeles (2007)
Agents of the Underground (2009)
Transmission.Alpha.Delta (2015)
Black Out The Sky (2018)
Songs of Armor and Devotion (2019)

T4 Project
Story-Based Concept Album (2008)

Jason Cruz and Howl
Loungecore (2012)
Good Man's Ruin (2014)

References

External links
Jason's website
Revolution On Canvas

1974 births
Living people
American punk rock singers
American male singer-songwriters
American singer-songwriters
American rock songwriters
21st-century American singers
21st-century American male singers